

Crown
Head of State – Queen Elizabeth II

Federal government
Governor General – Ray Hnatyshyn then Roméo LeBlanc

Cabinet
Prime Minister –  Jean Chrétien
Deputy Prime Minister – Sheila Copps
Minister of Finance – Paul Martin
Secretary of State for External Affairs – André Ouellet (replaced by position of Minister of Foreign Affairs on May 13.)
Minister of National Defence – David Collenette
Minister of National Health and Welfare – Diane Marleau
Minister of Industry, Science and Technology – John Manley (merged with the Minister of Consumer and Corporate Affairs position on March 28 to become Minister of Industry)
Minister of Intergovernmental Affairs – Marcel Massé
Minister of the Environment – Sheila Copps
Minister of Justice – Allan Rock
Minister of Transport – Doug Young
Minister of Communications – Michel Dupuy
Minister of Citizenship and Immigration – Sergio Marchi
Minister of Fisheries and Oceans – Brian Tobin
Minister of Agriculture – Ralph Goodale
Minister of Public Works – David Dingwall
Minister of Employment and Immigration – Lloyd Axworthy
Minister of Natural Resources – Anne McLellan (position created on January 12)
Minister of Energy, Mines and Resources – Anne McLellan (position discontinued on January 11)
Minister of Forestry – Anne McLellan (position discontinued on January 11)

Members of Parliament
See: 35th Canadian parliament

Party leaders
Liberal Party of Canada –  Jean Chrétien
Bloc Québécois – Lucien Bouchard
New Democratic Party- Audrey McLaughlin then Alexa McDonough
Progressive Conservative Party of Canada – Jean Charest
Reform Party of Canada – Preston Manning

Supreme Court Justices
Chief Justice: Antonio Lamer
Beverley McLachlin
Frank Iacobucci
John C. Major
Gérard V. La Forest
John Sopinka
Peter deCarteret Cory
Claire L'Heureux-Dubé
Charles D. Gonthier

Other
Speaker of the House of Commons – Gilbert Parent
Governor of the Bank of Canada – Gordon Thiessen
Chief of the Defence Staff – General John de Chastelain General Jean Boyle

Provinces

Premiers
Premier of Alberta – Ralph Klein
Premier of British Columbia – Mike Harcourt
Premier of Manitoba – Gary Filmon
Premier of New Brunswick – Frank McKenna
Premier of Newfoundland – Clyde Wells
Premier of Nova Scotia – John Savage
Premier of Ontario – Bob Rae then Mike Harris
Premier of Prince Edward Island – Catherine Callbeck
Premier of Quebec – Jacques Parizeau
Premier of Saskatchewan – Roy Romanow
Premier of the Northwest Territories – Nellie Cournoyea then Don Morin
Premier of Yukon – John Ostashek

Lieutenant-governors
Lieutenant-Governor of Alberta – Gordon Towers
Lieutenant-Governor of British Columbia – David Lam then Garde Gardom
Lieutenant-Governor of Manitoba – Yvon Dumont
Lieutenant-Governor of New Brunswick – Margaret Norrie McCain
Lieutenant-Governor of Newfoundland and Labrador – Frederick Russell
Lieutenant-Governor of Nova Scotia – James Kinley
Lieutenant-Governor of Ontario – Hal Jackman
Lieutenant-Governor of Prince Edward Island – Marion Reid then Gilbert Clements
Lieutenant-Governor of Quebec – Martial Asselin
Lieutenant-Governor of Saskatchewan – Jack Wiebe

Mayors
Toronto – Barbara Hall
Montreal – Pierre Bourque
Vancouver – Philip Owen
Ottawa – Jacquelin Holzman

Religious leaders
Roman Catholic Bishop of Quebec –  Archbishop Maurice Couture
Roman Catholic Bishop of Montreal –  Cardinal Archbishop Jean-Claude Turcotte
Roman Catholic Bishops of London – Bishop John Michael Sherlock
Moderator of the United Church of Canada – Marion Best

See also
1994 Canadian incumbents
Events in Canada in 1995
1996 Canadian incumbents
 Governmental leaders in 1995
Canadian incumbents by year

1995
Incumbents
1995 in Canadian politics
Canadian leaders